The 2019 L'Alcúdia International Football Tournament was a football competition which took place in July and August 2019. The 2019 edition was the fourth to feature only international youth teams. Previous editions had contained a mix of national selections and club selections.

Teams
The participating national teams are:

Group stage

Final

International association football competitions hosted by Spain
Youth association football competitions for international teams
2019 in association football
2019–20 in Spanish football
July 2019 sports events in Spain
August 2019 sports events in Spain